Market Weighton is a town and civil parish in the East Riding of Yorkshire, England. According to the 2011 UK census, Market Weighton parish had a population of 6,429, an increase on the 2001 UK census figure of 5,212.

History 
The 19th-century English lexicographer Sir William Smith proposed Market Weighton as the location of the still-undiscovered Roman camp of Delgovicia. Historically the town was listed in the Domesday Book as "Wicstun" and was granted its charter to become a market town in 1251. Notable architecture includes: a parish church, parts of which are Norman, the Londesborough Arms (an 18th-century coaching inn), a Wesleyan chapel, a Methodist chapel and a high street still recognisable from the 19th century. Other sights of interest include the post office, the duck pond and Station Farm.
In May of each year local residents take to the streets of Market Weighton for the Giant Community Day (formerly Giant Bradley Day) festival in a celebration of the life and times of William Bradley.
Industry in the town is largely based on agriculture. The town is known geologically for having given its name to the Market Weighton Axis.

The Yorkshire Wolds Way National Trail, a long-distance footpath, passes through the town.

Governance

As a civil parish, Market Weighton has a town council, which operates under the East Riding of Yorkshire Council.

In 2003, after some local consultation, the Weighton Area Regeneration Partnership (WARP) adopted a slogan and logo, 'The Heart of East Yorkshire', intended to indicate both its central location in the county and the strength of the local community. WARP was dissolved in 2012 but the phrase continued in use to promote the area and on local signage.

Landmarks

Market Weighton has three churches. These are the All Saints Church, St John's Methodist Church and the Roman Catholic Church of Our Lady of Perpetual Help. 
The church dedicated to All Saints was designated a Grade I listed building in 1967 and is now recorded in the National Heritage List for England, maintained by Historic England.

Transport 

Market Weighton railway station was at the junction of the lines to Selby, Driffield, York and Beverley. The last train ran in 1965. The abandoned lines to Beverley, and to Selby are now used as public paths, as the Hudson Way and Bubwith Rail Trail respectively.

Bus services provided by East Yorkshire Motor Services, link the town with Beverley, Hull, Pocklington, York, Holme on Spalding Moor, Driffield and Bridlington.

The three-mile £5.1 million A1079 bypass opened in March 1991.

The Minsters Rail Campaign is campaigning to re-open the railway line between Beverley and York (with stops at Stamford Bridge, Pocklington and Market Weighton). The re-opened railway would skirt the edge of the town as the former alignment has since been built over.

Business 
In the 1960s and 1970s Market Weighton had a Rolls-Royce and Bentley dealership owned by Robert B Massey and Company Ltd.

Notable people
William Bradley (1787–1820), tallest ever Briton
Barbara Foxley (1860–1958) suffragist and professor of education
William Umpleby Kirk, (1843–1928) photographer 
Frank Mitchell (1872–1935), cricketer
Hilda Lyon (1896–1946), engineer who invented the Lyon Shape

See also 
 Market Weighton Canal
 The Market Weighton School

References

External links

 
Market towns in the East Riding of Yorkshire
Civil parishes in the East Riding of Yorkshire
Towns in the East Riding of Yorkshire